1953 in sports describes the year's events in world sport.

American football
 NFL Championship: the Detroit Lions won 17–16 over the Cleveland Browns at Briggs Stadium

Association football
England
 First Division – Arsenal win the 1952–53 title.
 FA Cup – Blackpool beat Bolton Wanderers 4–3 in what is known as "The Matthews Final", although it is Stan Mortensen who scores a winning hat-trick for Blackpool.
 England lose 6–3 to Hungary at Wembley Stadium their first ever loss to a team from Continental Europe at home.
Scotland
 Coronation Cup (football) – Celtic beat Hibernian 2–0 at Hampden Park.
Spain
 La Liga won by Barcelona F.C.
Italy
 Serie A won by F.C. Internazionale Milano
West Germany
 German football championship won by 1. FC Kaiserslautern
France
 French Division 1 won by Stade de Reims
Portugal
 Primeira Liga won by Sporting C.P.

Australian rules football
 Victorian Football League
 23 May: Fitzroy, against a brilliant Footscray defence, kick the lowest VFL/AFL score since 1899, 1.0 (6) to 10.6 (66). Fitzroy seemed doomed to the first 0.0 (0) score in VFL history until Allan Ruthven scored a goal with ten minutes to go.
 4 July: Geelong beats Collingwood’s previous record of 20 consecutive wins, beating  12.14 (86) to 13.7 (85).
 1 August: Collingwood ends a run of 26 unbeaten games (including a draw with ) by Geelong, beating them 10.15 (75) to 7.13 (55)
 26 September: Collingwood wins the 57th VFL Premiership, beating Geelong 11.11 (77) to 8.17 (65)
 Brownlow Medal awarded to Bill Hutchison (Essendon)
 South Australian National Football League:
 3 October: West Torrens wins the last of its four SANFL premierships, beating Port Adelaide 9.13 (67) to 8.12 (60)
 Magarey Medal won by Jim Deane (South Adelaide)
 Western Australian National Football League:
 8 August: Bernie Naylor kicks a WANFL record 23 goals against , including twelve in one quarter.
 10 October:  win their second consecutive premiership and seventh overall, beating  18.12 (120) to 8.13 (61)
 Sandover Medal awarded to Merv McIntosh (Perth)

Baseball
 World Series – New York Yankees won 4 games to 2 over the Brooklyn Dodgers
 The Boston Braves of the National League moved to Milwaukee, becoming the first MLB franchise to relocate in 50 years.

Basketball
 NCAA Men's Basketball Championship –
 Indiana wins 69–68 over Kansas
 NBA Finals –
 Minneapolis Lakers won 4 games to 1 over the New York Knicks
 The eighth European basketball championship, Eurobasket 1953, is won by the Soviet Union.
 The fifteenth South American Basketball Championship in Montevideo is won by Uruguay.

Boxing
 September 24 in New York City – Rocky Marciano retains his World Heavyweight title with a TKO over Roland La Starza in the 11th round.
 October in New York City – Bobo Olson scored a 15-round decision over Randy Turpin to win the World Middleweight Championship

Bowling
Nine-pin bowling
 Nine-pin bowling World Championships –
 Men's champion: Alfred Beierl, Austria
 Women's champion: Jelena Šincek, Yugoslavia
 Men's team champion: Yugoslavia
 Women's team champion: Austria

Canadian football
 Grey Cup – Hamilton Tiger-Cats win 12–6 over the Winnipeg Blue Bombers

Cricket
England
 County Championship – Surrey
 Minor Counties Championship – Berkshire
 Most runs – Bill Edrich 2557 @ 47.35 (HS 211)
 Most wickets – Bruce Dooland 172 @ 16.58 (BB 7–19)
 Wisden Cricketers of the Year – Keith Miller, Neil Harvey, Johnny Wardle, Willie Watson, Tony Lock
Australia
 Sheffield Shield – South Australia
 Most runs – Neil Harvey 1659 @ 63.80 (HS 205)
 Most wickets – Hugh Tayfield 70 @ 27.91 (BB 7–71)
 South Africa make their first tour of Australia since 1931–32, and tie the five-Test series two-all with one draw
India
 Ranji Trophy – Holkar
New Zealand
 Plunket Shield – Otago
 Following their Australian tour, South Africa tour New Zealand, winning a two-Test series one-nil with one draw
South Africa
 Currie Cup – not contested
West Indies
 India make their first tour of the West Indies, losing a five-test series 0–1 with four draws.

Cycling
 Giro d'Italia won by Fausto Coppi of Italy
 Tour de France – Louison Bobet of France
 UCI Road World Championships – Men's road race – Fausto Coppi of Italy

Figure skating
 World Figure Skating Championships –
 Men's champion: Hayes Alan Jenkins, United States
 Ladies’ champion: Tenley Albright, United States
 Pair skating champions: Jennifer Nicks & John Nicks, Great Britain
 Ice dancing champions: Jean Westwood & Lawrence Demmy, Great Britain

Golf
Men's professional
 Masters Tournament – Ben Hogan
 U.S. Open – Ben Hogan
 PGA Championship – Walter Burkemo
 British Open – Ben Hogan
 PGA Tour money leader – Lew Worsham – $34,002
 Ryder Cup – United States wins 6½ to 5½ over the British team.
Men's amateur
 British Amateur – Joe Carr
 U.S. Amateur – Gene Littler
Women's professional
 Women's Western Open – Louise Suggs
 U.S. Women's Open – Betsy Rawls
 Titleholders Championship – Patty Berg
 LPGA Tour money leader – Louise Suggs  – $19,816

Harness racing
 Little Brown Jug for pacers won by Keystoner
 Hambletonian for trotters won by Helicopter
 Australian Inter Dominion Harness Racing Championship –
 Pacers: Captain Sandy

Horse racing
Steeplechases
 Cheltenham Gold Cup – Knock Hard
 Grand National – Early Mist
Hurdle races
 Champion Hurdle – Sir Ken
Flat races
 Australia – Melbourne Cup won by Wodalla
 Canada – Queen's Plate won by Canadiana
 France – Prix de l'Arc de Triomphe won by La Sorellina
 Ireland – Irish Derby Stakes won by Chamier
 English Triple Crown Races:
 2,000 Guineas Stakes – Nearula
 The Derby – Pinza
 St. Leger Stakes – Premonition
 United States Triple Crown Races:
 Kentucky Derby – Dark Star
 Preakness Stakes – Native Dancer
 Belmont Stakes – Native Dancer

Ice hockey
 World Hockey Championship
 Men's champion: Sweden defeated West Germany and Switzerland.
 Canada did not participate in the World Hockey Championship, the government claiming it was not worth the expense.
 Stanley Cup – Montreal Canadiens win 4 games to 1 over the Boston Bruins
 Art Ross Trophy as the NHL's leading scorer during the regular season: Gordie Howe, Detroit Red Wings
 Hart Memorial Trophy for the NHL's Most Valuable Player: Gordie Howe, Detroit Red Wings
 NCAA Men's Ice Hockey Championship – University of Michigan Wolverines defeat University of Minnesota Golden Gophers 7–3 in Colorado Springs, CO
 HC Kometa Brno was founded in South Moravian Region, Czechoslovakia, present day of Czech Republic.

Motorsport

Rugby league
1952–53 European Rugby League Championship / 1953–54 European Rugby League Championship
1953 New Zealand rugby league season
1953 NSWRFL season
1952–53 Northern Rugby Football League season / 1953–54 Northern Rugby Football League season

Rugby union
 59th Five Nations Championship series is won by England

Snooker
 World Snooker Championship – Fred Davis beats Walter Donaldson 37–34

Tennis
Australia
 Australian Men's Singles Championship – Ken Rosewall (Australia) defeats Mervyn Rose (Australia) 6–0, 6–3, 6–4
 Australian Women's Singles Championship – Maureen Connolly Brinker (USA) defeats Julia Sampson Hayward (USA) 6–3, 6–2
England
 Wimbledon Men's Singles Championship – Vic Seixas (USA) defeats Kurt Nielsen (Denmark) 9–7, 6–3, 6–4
 Wimbledon Women's Singles Championship – Maureen Connolly Brinker (USA) defeats Doris Hart (USA) 8–6, 7–5
France
 French Men's Singles Championship – Ken Rosewall (Australia) defeats Vic Seixas (USA) 6–3, 6–4, 1–6, 6–2
 French Women's Singles Championship – Maureen Connolly (USA) defeats Doris Hart (USA) 6–2, 6–4
USA
 American Men's Singles Championship – Tony Trabert (USA) defeats Vic Seixas (USA) 6–3, 6–2, 6–3
 American Women's Singles Championship – Maureen Connolly (USA) defeats Doris Hart (USA) 6–2, 6–4
Events
 Maureen Connolly becomes the first woman to win the Grand Slam in tennis.
Davis Cup
 1953 Davis Cup –  3–2  at Kooyong Stadium (grass) Melbourne, Australia

Multi-sport events
 Pan Arab Games held in Alexandria, Egypt

Awards
 Associated Press Male Athlete of the Year – Ben Hogan, PGA golf
 Associated Press Female Athlete of the Year – Maureen Connolly, Tennis

References

 
Sports by year